Helene Granqvist (born February 13, 1970 in Härnösand) is a Swedish curler.

She competed at the 1992 Winter Olympics when curling was a demonstration sport.

Teams

Women's

Mixed

References

External links

Living people
1970 births
People from Härnösand
Swedish female curlers
Swedish curling champions
Curlers at the 1992 Winter Olympics
Olympic curlers of Sweden
Sportspeople from Västernorrland County